Nadia Benbouta (born 21 January 1970) is an Algerian artist who lives and works in Paris.

Her art combines seemingly unrelated elements: found images from advertising, children's films and other sources, comic strip art, flags, weapons and decorative designs.

Her work has been displayed in solo shows in France, Germany and the Ukraine. She has participated in group exhibitions in Paris, Lyon, Marseille, Toulouse, Germany, Norway, Greece, Algeria and New York City.

Benbouta received the Prix Albéric Rocheron in 1998 and the Prix Fenêtre des Arts Européens awarded by the Sprengel Museum in Hanover in 1999.

References 

1970 births
Living people
Algerian women artists
Algerian artists
Algerian contemporary artists
People from Algiers
Artists from Paris
École des Beaux-Arts alumni
20th-century Algerian artists
21st-century Algerian artists